Jean-Pierre Louis Souche (2 September 1927 – 10 January 2020) was a French rower who competed in the 1948 Summer Olympics and in the 1952 Summer Olympics. He was born in Paris. In 1948 he was a crew member of the French boat which was eliminated in the semi-finals of the coxed fours event. Four years later he and his partner René Guissart finished fifth in the coxless pairs event. He died in Guérande in January 2020 at the age of 92.

References

External links
 Jean-Pierre Souche's profile at Sports Reference.com

1927 births
2020 deaths
French male rowers
Olympic rowers of France
Rowers at the 1948 Summer Olympics
Rowers at the 1952 Summer Olympics
European Rowing Championships medalists